Challenger Center for Space Science Education is a United States 501(c)(3) non-profit organization headquartered in Washington, DC. It was founded in 1986 by the families of the astronauts who died in the Space Shuttle Challenger disaster on January 28, 1986.

The organization offers dynamic, hands-on exploration and discovery opportunities to students around the world. These programs equip students with the knowledge, confidence, and skills that will help better our national social and economic well-being.

Challenger Learning Centers give students the chance to become astronauts and engineers and solve real-world problems as they share the thrill of discovery on missions through the Solar System. Using space simulation and role-playing strategies, students bring their classroom studies to life and cultivate the skills needed for future success.

United States

International 

Challenger Learning Center at the Ontario Science Center (Toronto, Canada)
Challenger Learning Center at SongAm Space Center (Gyeonggi-do, South Korea)
Challenger Learning Center at the National Space Centre (Leicester, United Kingdom)

Board of directors
Notable members of the Board of Directors include:
Charles Resnik MD - Brother of Judith Resnik

References

External links

Teacher resources

Space Shuttle program
Science education in the United States
NASA Museum Alliance